Yavor Dimitrov Yanakiev (born 3 June 1985 in Stara Zagora) is a Bulgarian wrestler who won the bronze medal in the Men's Greco-Roman 74kg at the 2008 Summer Olympics in Beijing.

Yanakiev currently competes for Slavia Litex, where his coach is Stoyan Dobrev; his first coach was Petar

References
 

Bulgarian male sport wrestlers
Wrestlers at the 2008 Summer Olympics
Olympic bronze medalists for Bulgaria
Olympic wrestlers of Bulgaria
Sportspeople from Stara Zagora
Living people
Olympic medalists in wrestling
Medalists at the 2008 Summer Olympics
European Games competitors for Bulgaria
Wrestlers at the 2015 European Games
World Wrestling Championships medalists
Year of birth missing (living people)
European Wrestling Championships medalists
20th-century Bulgarian people
21st-century Bulgarian people